Southgate Street is one of the ancient streets in the City of Gloucester, so named because its southern end was originally the location of the south gate in the city's walls. The part beyond the gate as far as Severn Street was sometimes known as Lower Southgate Street. It runs from the crossroads of Northgate, Eastgate, Southgate, and Westgate Streets in the north (The Cross) to Bristol Road in the south.

History
The street dates from at least 1500 when the southern gate in the city's defences was approximately where Commercial Road meets Southgate Street today.

Listed buildings and structures

Listed buildings and structures in Southgate Street, north to south, are:

East side

 St Michael's Tower
 5 Southgate Street
 9 and 9A Southgate Street
 27 Southgate Street
 29 and 31 Southgate Street
 Former St Mary de Crypt School
 St Mary de Crypt Church
 35 Southgate Street
 Copner House
 53 Southgate Street
 55 and 57 Southgate Street
 59 Southgate Street
 61 Southgate Street
 Albion House, formerly the Albion Hotel, designed by Thomas Fulljames.
 K6 Telephone kiosk
 The Whitesmith's Arms
 83 and 85 Southgate Street
 105 Southgate Street
 107 Southgate Street
 109 Southgate Street
 111 Southgate Street
 113 and 115 Southgate Street
 117 and 119 Southgate Street
 2 Spa Road (on the corner with Southgate Street)
 Spalite Hotel
 123-131 Southgate Street
 133 and 135 Southgate Street
 137 Southgate Street
 139 and 141 Southgate Street
 143-151 Southgate Street
 155 and 157 Southgate Street

West side

 12 and 14 Southgate Street
 16 and 18 Southgate Street
 24, 24A and 26 Southgate Street
 28 Southgate Street
 Robert Raikes' House
 40 Southgate Street
 42 Southgate Street
 New County Hotel
 Black Swan Hotel
 1 Commercial Road
 74 Southgate Street
 76 Southgate Street
 78 Southgate Street
 Weighbridge House
 The Tall Ships Public House
 140 and 142 Southgate Street
 172 Southgate Street
 182 and 184 Southgate Street

See also
 High Orchard

References

External links 

Streets in Gloucester